William Johnston Hovde (4 April 1917 – 13 March 1996) was a United States Air Force colonel and a World War II flying ace. Hovde served two tours in the 355th Fighter Group and commanded the 358th Fighter Squadron, ending the war with 10.5 victories. He also served in the Korean War, claiming another victory while in command of the 335th Fighter Squadron. After serving as an attaché in Mexico, Hovde commanded Ethan Allen Air Force Base and the 14th Fighter Group. He retired in 1967, and worked in the liquor business before finally retiring and moving to San Antonio. Hovde became president of the American Fighter Aces Association.

Early life
Hovde was born on 4 April 1917 in Crookston, Minnesota to Ole, a Norwegian immigrant salesman, and Lou Hovde. He graduated from Central High School there in 1935 and attended the University of North Dakota between 1936 and 1938, receiving a freshman scholarship award.

Military service
He enlisted in the Minnesota National Guard on 1 September 1932 and served with the 205th Infantry until separating from the military on 17 April 1937. He then joined the university ROTC program. Hovde successfully applied for the United States Military Academy and attended the Silverman Preparatory School in New York City after receiving his appointment to West Point. Hovde was entered as a cadet at West Point in July 1939. At West Point, he participated in athletics, including boxing.

World War II

Hovde entered pilot training and received his wings on 13 December 1942. He was commissioned into the United States Army Air Forces as a second lieutenant on 19 January 1943. He completed Republic P-47 Thunderbolt training at Spence Field. In May, he was assigned to the 358th Fighter Squadron, 355th Fighter Group in England, serving as a flight leader. The squadron deployed to England in July at RAF Steeple Morden.

On 15 February 1944, Hovde was awarded the Distinguished Flying Cross, "for extraordinary achievement", completing 50 missions or the equivalent. Hovde claimed his first air victory as a fighter pilot, a Focke-Wulf Fw 190 over the Münster area, on 22 February 1944. The 358th Fighter Squadron began converting to the North American P-51 Mustang in March.
He was promoted to major on 9 March. On 18 March, Hovde flew a P-51 in a penetration and target support mission for heavy bombers attacking a target in Germany. During the withdrawal from the target, Hovde spotted fifteen enemy Fw 190s attacking the American bombers, leading his flight in the attack and claiming one victory. This enabled the bombers to continue their flight back to England. The German fighters attacked again while Hovde reformed his flight. He then shot down another Fw 190. While returning from this action, he was attacked by two enemy fighters, one of which he heavily damaged before running out of ammunition. On 5 June, he was awarded the Silver Star "for gallantry in action".

On 4 April, Hovde claimed a fourth victory. The next day, he received a Bronze Oak Leaf Cluster in lieu of another DFC for completing forty missions and shooting down the German aircraft. In May, Hovde's first tour of duty ended and he returned to the continental United States for rest and recuperation, and then volunteered for a second tour. Hovde returned to the squadron as its commander on 10 July.  On 19 July, Hovde downed a German Messerschmitt Bf 109 over Augsburg, becoming the group's eighth ace. On 27 July, he was awarded a second Bronze Oak Leaf Cluster to his DFC, "for heroism and extraordinary achievement", claiming three victories.

He commanded the 358th Fighter Squadron until 2 August 1944, subsequently serving as the squadron operations officer.

On 15 September, Hovde received a third Bronze Oak Leaf Cluster to his DFC, "for heroism and extraordinary achievement", shooting down three enemy aircraft. On 5 December, during a bomber escort mission over Berlin, Hovde led the group in an attack on more than 100 Bf 109s and Fw 190s, shooting down five and sharing a sixth. In this action, his aircraft developed mechanical difficulties and his fuel reserve became critically short. On 13 March 1945, Hovde was awarded the Distinguished Service Cross for extraordinary heroism.

On 30 March, he was awarded a fourth Bronze Oak Leaf Cluster to his DFC, "for extraordinary achievement" in combat missions. Hovde was credited with 10.5 victories in air combat and another damaged, as well as two resulting from airfield strafing. Hovde again commanded the 358th Fighter Squadron between 7 May and August 1945.

Interbellum
Hovde was deputy commander of the 355th Fighter Group, between October 1945 and March 1946, serving on occupation duty in Germany. In Augsburg, he met Norma Gentner (died October 2000), a dancer whom he married in 1949. Hovde commanded the 357th Fighter Squadron between March and September. He then served with the 71st Fighter Squadron and the 12th Reconnaissance Squadron at March Field for the next two years. In September 1948, he went to Ecuador to serve as an advisor to the Ecuadorian Air Force for P-47 training.

Korean War
Hovde was sent back to the United States in September 1950. In October, he was stationed in Korea. In Korea, he was an operations officer, executive officer, and the commander of the 335th Fighter Squadron, 4th Fighter Group, flying the North American F-86 Sabre (F-86 Sabrejet) since it arrived in Korea in December. His command of the squadron ended after he was court-martialed in July 1951 for buzzing the Johnson Air Base golf course while the base commander was playing golf. Later that year, he was executive officer of the 4th Fighter-Interceptor Wing.

Hovde flew 44 combat missions in Korea between October 1950 and August 1951, and claimed one victory, a Russian made Mikoyan-Gurevich MiG-15, on 24 April 1951. Hovde was awarded a Silver Oak Leaf Cluster in lieu of a sixth DFC, "for extraordinary achievement" while the commander of the 335th Fighter Squadron in Korea. He returned to the United States from Korea, and attended the Strategic Intelligence School at Fort Myer. In December 1951, he was assigned as the American Air attaché in Mexico City.

Post-war
He was the American Air attaché in Mexico City until March 1955. On 20 April 1955, he was promoted to colonel. Hovde became operations director of the 4709th Air Defense Wing at McGuire Air Force Base between April 1955 and May 1956. Hovde took command of the 14th Fighter Group and simultaneously was base commander at Ethan Allen Air Force Base until August 1958. He then attended the Air War College, graduating in July 1959.

Hovde served at the USAF Headquarters on the National Security Council's Evaluation Subcommittee in the Pentagon until September 1962, when he entered the Defense Intelligence School Attaché course, completing it in February 1963. Hovde served as air attaché in Mexico City again until retiring on 30 June 1967.

Later years
Hovde spent nine years in the liquor business, and then retired to San Antonio. He became president of the American Fighter Aces Association, and died on 13 March 1996. Hovde was buried at the Arlington National Cemetery.

Military awards
Hovde's military decorations and awards include:

References

1917 births
1996 deaths
American World War II flying aces
United States Army Air Forces pilots of World War II
United States Air Force colonels
United States Air Force personnel of the Korean War
American Korean War pilots
Recipients of the Distinguished Service Cross (United States)
Recipients of the Silver Star
Recipients of the Distinguished Flying Cross (United Kingdom)
Recipients of the Air Medal
Recipients of the Legion of Merit
United States Air Force personnel who were court-martialed
Air War College alumni
Burials at Arlington National Cemetery
Minnesota National Guard personnel
United States Military Academy alumni
People from Crookston, Minnesota
American people of Norwegian descent
United States Air Force officers
Recipients of the Croix de Guerre 1939–1945 (France)
United States air attachés
American expatriates in Ecuador
American expatriates in Mexico